Alf Johansen (1 January 1903 – 3 July 1974) was a Norwegian footballer. He played in one match for the Norway national football team in 1926.

References

External links
 

1903 births
1974 deaths
Norwegian footballers
Norway international footballers
Place of birth missing
Association footballers not categorized by position